Achenium is a genus of beetle belonging to the family Staphylinidae.

The genus was first described by Leach in 1819.

The species of this genus are found in Europe.

Species:
 Achenium aequatum Erichson, 1840
 Achenium humile (Nicolai, 1822)

References

Paederinae
Staphylinidae genera